The name Benezet or the accented Bénézet may refer to:

People
Saint Benezet, medieval saint
Anthony Benezet, Quaker educationalist
Louis P. Bénézet, American educationalist
Louis T. Benezet, American educationalist (son of the above)
Mathieu Bénézet (1946-2013), French author
Nicolas Benezet, French football player

Places
Pont Saint-Bénezet, a bridge in Avignon
Saint-Bénézet, a commune in Gard, France

Surnames of French origin